Macrosphyra is a genus of flowering plants in the tribe Gardenieae of the family Rubiaceae native to Africa.

References

Rubiaceae genera
Gardenieae